Maria Kowroski is an American ballet dancer. She was a principal dancer at the New York City Ballet.

Early life
Kowroski was born in Grand Rapids, Michigan. She started ballet at the age of five. In 1992, she entered the School of American Ballet in New York City.

Career
In 1994, at the age of 17, Kowroski entered the New York City Ballet as an apprentice, and became a member of the corps de ballet a year later. She was promoted to soloist in 1997 and principal dancer in 1999. She has danced classical productions such as Swan Lake, Balanchine's works including Tchaikovsky Pas de Deux and The Nutcracker, and originated roles such as Christopher Wheeldon's After the Rain. Before her retirement she was the company's most senior dancer, and the only remaining dancer to have worked with founding choreographer Jerome Robbins.

Kowroski had danced with Mariinsky Ballet and Munich Ballet as guest artist. She also performed in Dance Against Cancer's 2019 concert. Also in 2019, Kowroski and fellow principal dancer Tyler Angle staged Agon for the School of American Ballet's showcase.

Kowroski served as motion capture dancer of Barbie for Barbie in the Nutcracker, Barbie of Swan Lake and Barbie in the 12 Dancing Princesses. She also appeared in a documentary regarding the latter.

She retired in October 2021 and became the acting artistic director of the New Jersey Ballet.

Selected repertoire
Kowroski's repertoire with the New York City Ballet includes:

Personal life
Kowroski is married to actor and former Royal Ballet dancer Martin Harvey. They have a son, born in 2016. Kowroski's mother died due to cancer.

Filmography

References

1976 births
Living people
Prima ballerinas
American ballerinas
New York City Ballet principal dancers
Princess Grace Awards winners
School of American Ballet alumni
People from Grand Rapids, Michigan
Dancers from Michigan
21st-century American ballet dancers
Morphoses dancers
21st-century American women